SenseTime is a Hong Kong-headquartered artificial intelligence company with offices in China, Indonesia, Japan, South Korea, Macau, Malaysia, the Philippines, Saudi Arabia, Singapore, Taiwan, Thailand and the United Arab Emirates. The company develops technologies including facial recognition, image recognition, object detection, optical character recognition, medical image analysis, video analysis, autonomous driving, and remote sensing. Since 2019, SenseTime has been repeatedly sanctioned by the U.S. government due to allegations that its facial recognition technology has been deployed in the surveillance and internment of the Uyghurs and other ethnic and religious minorities. SenseTime denies the allegations.

The China Internet Investment Fund, a state-owned enterprise controlled by the Cyberspace Administration of China, holds a partial ownership stake in SenseTime.

History

2014
SenseTime was co-founded in October 2014 by Tang Xiao'ou, a professor of the Department of Information Engineering at the Chinese University of Hong Kong (CUHK), and computer scientist Xu Li, among others. During 2014, SenseTime unveiled its face recognition algorithms, DeepID.

2015

During 2015, nine of SenseTime's papers were accepted into the Conference on Computer Vision and Pattern Recognition (CVPR).

2016

In 2016, 16 of SenseTime's papers were accepted in the CVPR Conference, and during the year's ImageNet competition, the company won first place in the object detection, video object detection, and scene analysis.

2017

In 2017, 43 SenseTime publications were recognized by the CVPR and the International Conference on Computer Vision (ICCV).

In October 2017, Qualcomm entered into a collaboration agreement with SenseTime. The following month, the Shanghai Municipal Government signed a strategic alliance agreement with SenseTime. In December 2017, Honda and SenseTime signed a collaboration agreement.

In November 2017, SenseTime set up a 'smart policing' company with Leon, a major supplier of data analysis and surveillance technology in Xinjiang.

2018
In February 2018, SenseTime and MIT announced the creation of a programme to further advance AI research. The programme was cancelled by MIT in 2020 following revelations of SenseTime's involvement in the persecution of Uyghurs and other ethnic and religious minorities.

In April 2018, SenseTime, Alibaba, and the Hong Kong Science and Technology Parks Corporation (HKSTP) partnered together to form a nonprofit artificial intelligence lab in Hong Kong. The following month, SenseTime signed a collaborative memorandum of understanding with Nanyang Technological University (NTU), the National Supercomputing Centre of Singapore and Singapore Telecommunications Limited (SingTel). In August of that same summer, SenseTime launched its first North American smart health lab in New Jersey.

In September 2018, SenseTime became one of the founding members of the Global Artificial Intelligence Academic Alliance (GAIAA), along with the Chinese University of Hong Kong, the Massachusetts Institute of Technology, the University of Sydney, Shanghai Jiao Tong University, Tsinghua University, Fudan University, Zhejiang University, Nanyang Technological University, and seven other universities.

On 20 September 2018, SenseTime was named as China's National Open Innovation Platform for Next-Generation Artificial Intelligence on Intelligent Vision.

The Wall Street Journal reported that SenseTiime was valued at $7.7 billion at the end of 2018.

2019

SenseTime joined MIT's Quest for Intelligence campaign.

SenseTime has a large high-performance computing network which supports its development and fielding of AI applications. According to a report by Gregory C. Allen of the Center for a New American Security, SenseTime's computing network includes "54,000,000 Graphical Processing Unit (GPU) cores across 15,000 GPUs within 12 GPU clusters."

In April 2019, The New York Times reported that SenseTime's software was used in the development of facial recognition systems used by the Chinese government directed largely at Uyghurs. In November 2019, SenseTime led a committee tasked with developing a standard for facial recognition in China.

In October 2019, SenseTime was placed on the United States Bureau of Industry and Security's Entity List for using its technology for human rights abuses in Xinjiang.

2020
In August 2020, Bloomberg News reported that SenseTime was considering an IPO in Hong Kong.

2021
On 9 July, SenseTime appointed Liu Cixin as advisor to its sci-fi research project. On 19 July, SenseTime launched its international AI innovation hub in Singapore.

In August, SenseTime filed for IPO on Hong Kong Stock Exchange and, in November, received regulatory approval to list.

In September 2021, Axios reported that SenseTime uses a subsidiary, Shanghai SenseTime, to sidestep U.S. sanctions targeting subsidiary Beijing SenseTime.

On 10 December 2021, on Human Rights Day, the United States Department of the Treasury placed the company on an investment blacklist on its IPO pricing day because of its alleged human rights abuses in Xinjiang, banning U.S. investment in the company. The company denied the allegations, said it had “been caught in the middle of geopolitical disputes," and postponed its Hong Kong IPO plan. The company hired law firm Hughes Hubbard & Reed, which argued that the investment ban did not apply to the company's parent domiciled in the Cayman Islands.

The IPO, which had already been downsized from an expected US$2 billion to $767 million due to a PRC crackdown on tech companies, was delayed further. On 13 December, SenseTime announced that it will postpone its IPO. Its $767 million Hong Kong dollars offering was relaunched in Hong Kong on 20 December. On 30 December, SenseTime completed its IPO on the Hong Kong Stock Exchange.

2022 
On February 18, index compiler Hang Seng Indexes Co. added SenseTime to the Hang Seng TECH Index.

On August 9, SenseTime launched its first consumer-facing product – SenseRobot – a Chinese chess-playing robot.

On August 19, Hang Seng Indexes included SenseTime in the Hang Seng China Enterprises Index and increased its weighting in Hang Seng TECH Index from 0.15 to 1.76.

On October 31, flagshp Chinese publication of SPH Media Trust, Lianhe Zaobao, inked a memorandum of understanding (MOU) with SenseTime to digitalise the newspaper's work processes for visual content.

2023 
In February 2023, SenseTime was invited to join the HKSAR delegation's visit to Saudi Arabia. During the trip, SenseTime exchanged an MOU with King Abdullah Financial District and Sela, a cultural tourism event management company in Saudi Arabia, to deepen collaborations in areas including smart city and digital tourism.

References

External links

Chinese University of Hong Kong
Information technology companies of Hong Kong
2014 establishments in Hong Kong
Facial recognition software
Data mining and machine learning software
Softbank portfolio companies
2021 initial public offerings
Companies listed on the Hong Kong Stock Exchange